Kuopio Senior High School of Music and Dance was a specialized high school for music and dance which was founded in 1968. The dance curriculum was started in 1983. The high school was the first specialized senior high of Finnish high schools, which specialized in music and dance. The school gained the name Kuopion yhteiskoulun musiikkilukio in 1995. In 2015, the high school merged with Minna Canth Senior High School to form  (Kuopion taidelukio Lumit).

Naturally students could get the standard Finnish upper secondary school education in preparation for the matriculation examination, including mathematics, languages, sciences, history etc. The music curriculum gave insights into Music Theory and Music History, as well as instrumental/group/orchestra/choir work. Dancers had the choice of taking classical ballet classes as well as modern dance. The high school had approximately 230 students, and about half of them came from outside Kuopio.

Associated schools
Close cooperation with nearby  gave the students greater chances to study there. The classes completed in the conservatory or in the high school were valid in both institutions when applicable, and thus they could be counted among the necessary 75 classes for the completion of the upper secondary school. At least 12 of 75 classes had to be music or dance classes.

The school also cooperated with Kuopio Conservatoire, Sibelius Academy's Kuopio unit and Petrozavodsk's Art School number 1. Senior high was one part of unique education chain of music, which went all the way from kindergarten to Doctor's qualification.

Artist of the Year 
Artist of the Year is a diploma that was awarded every year to one former student who had made a great public career. The student had to have attended the Kuopio Senior High School of Music and Dance and had to have taken the Matriculation Examination there in order to be eligible.

The Artists of the Year:
 2001 Musician Sari Kaasinen
 2002 Dancer-choreographer 
 2003 Piano artist Mikael Kemppainen
 2004 Musician Erja Lyytinen
 2005 Director-choreographer Minna Vainikainen
 2006 Playwright 
 2007 Musician Marko Hietala
 2008 Musician 
 2009 Dancer  and dancer Liisa Ruuskanen
 2010 Musician Paula Vesala

Other former students of the high school
 
 Jenni Vartiainen

References

External links
Kuopio Senior High School of Music and Dance

Music schools in Finland
Secondary schools in Finland
Educational institutions established in 1968
Educational institutions disestablished in 2015
Senior High School of Music and Dance